The following ships of the Indian Navy have been named INS Kuthar:

 was a Type 14  commissioned in 1959

Indian Navy ship names